Mount Burrell is a town and a mountain in the Nightcap Range in the Tweed Shire in the Northern Rivers region of New South Wales, Australia.

Demographics
In 2011, the population of Mount Burrell was 484, with 49.8% female and 50.2% male. The median age of the Mount Burrell population was 47 years of age, 10 years above the Australian median. 77.9% of people living in Mount Burrell were born in Australia. The other top responses for country of birth were England 5%, New Zealand 2.9%, Germany 1.2%, Switzerland 1%, Fiji 0.8%, and 10.9% other countries. 91.9% of people spoke only English at home; the next most common languages were 1.7% German, 1% Dutch, 1% African Languages, 3.7% other languages.

See also 

 List of mountains in New South Wales
 Nightcap National Park

References 

Suburbs of Tweed Heads, New South Wales
Burrell
Northern Rivers